The Scottish Storytelling Centre, the world's first purpose-built modern centre for live storytelling, is located on the High Street in Edinburgh's Royal Mile, Scotland, United Kingdom. It was formally opened on 1 June 2006 by Patricia Ferguson MSP, Minister for Culture in the Scottish Executive. Donald Smith is Director of the Scottish Storytelling Centre, and himself a storyteller, playwright, novelist and performance poet.

The new building, designed by Malcolm Fraser Architects, replaced the former Netherbow Arts Centre, which itself replaced the Moray-Knox Church, demolished in the 1960s. It incorporates John Knox House.

It is also used as a venue during the Edinburgh Festival Fringe.

In June 2016 the Centre celebrated its 10th anniversary, which coincided with a programme of events to mark the 20th anniversary of patron George Mackay Brown's death.

In 2017, the centre was nominated for Best Performing Arts Venue in the Sunday Herald Culture Awards.

Festivals 
The centre is home to two annual festivals: 
 Scottish International Storytelling Festival 
 Edinburgh Tradfest.

References

External links
Scottish Storytelling Centre website

Buildings and structures completed in 2006
Buildings and structures in Edinburgh
Royal Mile
Arts in Scotland